Bangladesh–South Korea relations refer to the diplomatic and bilateral relations between the countries of Bangladesh and South Korea. In 1974, South Korea opened its embassy in the capital Dhaka, with the latter nation opening its embassy in 1987.

History
In 2008, the Ministry of Justice of South Korea ceased the protocol of visa exemption. It was decided that because the amount 
of temporary residents from Bangladesh reached over 13,000 throughout South Korea, both nations should get permission from each country to enter from 15 July 2008 onwards.

In South Korea, there are more than 13,000 Bangladeshi foreign workers in the country. A significant number of them are temporary immigrants. This has led to prejudice towards Bangladeshi expatriates, an issue tackled by the 2009 South Korean film Bandhobi, directed by Sin Dong-il.

See also 
 Foreign relations of Bangladesh 
 Foreign relations of South Korea
 Buddhism in Bangladesh 
 Christianity in Bangladesh
 Islam in Korea 
 Hinduism in Korea

References

External links 
 Embassy of Bangladesh
 Embassy of Republic of Korea
 Ministry of Commerce Bangladesh
 Bangladesh Bridge Authority

 
Korea, South
Bilateral relations of South Korea